Strážov is a town in Klatovy District in the Plzeň Region of the Czech Republic. It has about 1,400 inhabitants. The historic town centre is well preserved and is protected by law as an urban monument zone.

Administrative parts
Villages of Božtěšice, Brtí, České Hamry, Horní Němčice, Javoříčko, Kněžice, Krotějov, Lehom, Lukavice, Mladotice, Opálka, Rovná, Splž, Viteň and Zahorčice are administrative parts of Strážov.

Etymology
The name of the town is derived from stráž (i.e. ""guard") from its original purpose when there was a guarding point of a trade route from Zwiesel to Bohemia.

Geography
It lies in the Bohemian Forest Foothills. The Jelenka Stream flows through the territory.

History
The first written mention of Strážov is from 1352. The settlement was probably founded in the middle of the 13th century. Silver and lead began to be mined in the 15th century.

Louis II of Hungary granted Strážov's town privileges on 24 July 1524, and the right to the fortifications and the coat of arms a year later. Soon after, the mines were depleted. The town was burned during the Thirty Years' War (in 1641) by Swedes. Strážov was recovering slowly. The stimulus for its development was mainly the production of lace (first mentioned in 1725) and the establishment of a leather factory.

Demographics

Sights

The historic town centre is protected as an urban monument zone, because it has retained the distinctive character of a foothill town with several valuable buildings in both folk and urban architecture.

The main landmark of the town is the Church of Saint George. First documented in 1384, it was built in the early Gothic style in the 13th century. Modifications were made in the 19th century.

The Opálka Castle is located in the village of Opálka. It was a small medieval Gothic castle (sometimes referred to as a fortress) from the 14th century, rebuilt in the Renaissance style in the mid-16th century. In the mid-18th century, during the Baroque period, it was extended. The Chapel of Saint Anne in the area dates from the first half of the 19th century. Today, the castle is in poor condition and is being repaired.

Notable people
Abraham Benisch (1811–1878), Hebraist and journalist

Gallery

References

External links

Cities and towns in the Czech Republic
Populated places in Klatovy District